George Gladstone, also known as George Gladstone Marais, (14 January 1901 – 19 May 1978) was a West Indian cricketer who played in one Test match in 1930.

External links
 

1901 births
1978 deaths
West Indies Test cricketers
Jamaican cricketers
Jamaica cricketers